Patrick Douglas Lashley, known as Peter Lashley (born 11 February 1937 in Christ Church, Barbados) is a former cricketer. He played four Tests for the West Indies in the 1960s. 

A middle-order batsman who became an opener later in his career, Lashley played domestic cricket for Barbados from 1958 to 1975. His top score was 204 against Guyana in 1966-67.

Lashley toured Australia in 1960-61 and England in 1966 with the West Indian team, but was not able to establish himself in the Test side. Geoffrey Boycott stated that Lashley was the worst bowler ever to dismiss him in Test cricket – Boycott was his only Test victim, in the Fourth Test at Leeds in 1966.

References

External links
 

1937 births
Living people
Barbadian cricketers
West Indies Test cricketers
Barbados cricketers
International Cavaliers cricketers
People from Christ Church, Barbados